Backpackers is a mixed genre travel-reality television program created by and starring friends Mick Middleton, James Grech (JAG) and Lee Mahoney from Colac, Victoria.

The show was shot on three cameras over a year as Middleton, Grech and Mahoney left everything behind and backpacked on a shoestring budget around Europe.

It began airing in Australia on 13 November 2006 on Foxtel's Channel V, but had already been picked up and aired in other countries throughout the world, including OLN Canada, C4 New Zealand, Extreme sports channel Extreme Sports Channel in England, in Turkey, Dream TV Turkey and Channel V in Malaysia.

The program has received mixed reviews and cult recognition due to the nature in which the three backpackers went about making the show on small cameras and traveling on their own funds, interviewing, partying and recording all the random moments that occurred throughout the trip.

Backpackers has been both criticized and praised  for its honest portrayal of a year of budget travel and has received a small cult base.

Episode list

External links 

Official Facebook Page
Channel V site

Australian non-fiction television series
2000s Australian reality television series
2006 Australian television series debuts
Australian travel television series
2008 Australian television series endings
Channel V Australia original programming